R. Lanier Anderson is an American philosopher and J. E. Wallace Sterling Professor in Humanities at Stanford University. He is an expert on Kant and post-Kantian philosophy, and has published widely on both Kant and Nietzsche.

Education and career
Anderson earned his Bachelor of Arts in philosophy from Yale University summa cum laude, with an exceptional distinction in the philosophy major. Anderson earned his M.A. and Ph.D. at the University of Pennsylvania in philosophy in 1993, and has been teaching at Stanford since 1996. Anderson has previously been a professor at Harvard University, the University of Pennsylvania, Haverford College, and Bryn Mawr College.

Anderson is the Executive Director of North American Nietzsche Society.

Books
The Poverty of Conceptual Truth: Kant’s Analytic/Synthetic Distinction and the Limits of Metaphysics, OUP, 2015

References

External links
 R. Lanier Anderson at Stanford University
The Art of Living - R Lanier Anderson

21st-century American philosophers
Philosophy academics
University of Pennsylvania School of Arts and Sciences alumni
Yale College alumni
Stanford University faculty
Living people
Kant scholars
Nietzsche scholars
Year of birth missing (living people)